Marko Simonović (born October 15, 1999) is a Montenegrin professional basketball player for the Chicago Bulls of the National Basketball Association (NBA).

Professional career

Mens Sana (2017–2018) 
Simonović started playing professional basketball for Italian lower-league club PMS Moncalieri in 2015. In July 2017, Simonović signed a contract for Mens Sana Siena.

Olimpija (2018–2019) 
On June 19, 2018, Simonović signed a multi-year contract for Petrol Olimpija.

Mega Basket (2019–2021) 
On July 19, 2019, Simonović was loaned out to Mega Bemax for two years.

Simonovic averaged 16.8 points per game on 51% shooting from the field on 11.5 attempts per game, 31% from three on 2.5 attempts per game, 80% from the free throw line on 5.2 attempts per game, eight rebounds, 3.5 offensive rebounds, 1.2 assists, one steal, 1.2 blocks, 2.2 turnovers and 3.8 personal fouls per game in a starting role where he played 29.7 minutes a game in a total of 24 games in all competitions.

Chicago Bulls (2021–present) 
On November 18, 2020, Simonović was selected with the 44th overall pick in the 2020 NBA draft by the Chicago Bulls. In August 2021, Simonović joined the Chicago Bulls for the NBA Summer League. On August 9, he made his debut in the Summer League in a 94–77 loss to the New Orleans Pelicans in which he posted 13 points and 5 rebounds in 15 minutes. On August 18, 2021, Simonović officially signed a three-year contract with the Bulls. On November 22, Simonović made his NBA debut in a 109–77 loss to the Indiana Pacers in which he posted one point and one rebound in 7 minutes.

In July 2022, Simonović joined the Bulls for the 2022 NBA Summer League. He was later named to the All-NBA Summer League Second Team.

Career statistics

NBA

Regular season

|-
| style="text-align:left;"| 
| style="text-align:left;"| Chicago
| 9 || 0 || 3.9 || .267 || .200 || .727 || 1.1 || .0 || .1 || .1 || 1.9
|- class="sortbottom"
| style="text-align:center;" colspan="2"| Career
| 9 || 0 || 3.9 || .267 || .200 || .727 || 1.1 || .0 || .1 || .1 || 1.9

See also 
 List of NBA drafted players from Serbia
 List of Montenegrin NBA players

References

External links
 Eurobasket.com profile
 DraftExpress Profile
 Eurohopes Profile

1999 births
Living people
ABA League players
Centers (basketball)
Chicago Bulls draft picks
Chicago Bulls players
People from Kolašin
KK Mega Basket players
KK Olimpija players
Mens Sana Basket players
Montenegrin expatriate basketball people in Italy
Montenegrin expatriate basketball people in Serbia
Montenegrin expatriate basketball people in Slovenia
Montenegrin expatriate basketball people in the United States
Montenegrin men's basketball players
National Basketball Association players from Montenegro
Roseto Sharks players
Windy City Bulls players